School of Educational Innovation and Teacher Preparation, founded in 1998, is located on Arizona State University's Polytechnic Campus in Mesa, Arizona.

Undergraduate programs

 Early Childhood Education
 Elementary Education
 Physical Education
 Secondary Education
 Special Education

Graduate programs

 Curriculum and Instruction (M.Ed.)
 Special Education (M.Ed.)
 Physical Education (M.P.E.)
 Physical Education (Ph.D.)
 Post-Baccalaureate Certification

References

External links
 School of Educational Innovation and Teacher Preparation

Arizona State University